The Fine Art of Surfacing is the third album by Irish rock band The Boomtown Rats, released in June 1979. The album peaked at No. 7 on the UK Albums Chart in 1979.

"I Don't Like Mondays" was released as the album's first single in July 1979 and reached No. 1 on the UK Singles Chart. The song refers to Brenda Ann Spencer's killing spree, which occurred on Monday, 29 January 1979 in San Diego, California. The album also produced the singles "Diamond Smiles" and "Someone's Looking at You".

The Boomtown Rats travelled around the United States leading up to The Fine Art of Surfacing, drumming up publicity in the country. During this time the band learned much about both American life and breaking into the American music market. The album takes a serious approach in looking at American society in songs like "I Don't Like Mondays" and "Diamond Smiles", while other times looking at it in a downright silly and mocking manner, as in songs like "Nothing Happened Today" and "Having My Picture Taken".

In 2005, the album was re-released (it had previously been released but fell out of print quickly), digitally remastered by Bob Geldof and Pete Briquette with bonus tracks, mostly B-sides from various eras, that delve more deeply into the Rats' musical influences.

Reception

David Fricke of Rolling Stone highlighted the album's musical diversity, writing that "much of the Boomtown Rats' smarmy charm comes from an elusiveness that defies categorization because it draws from dozens of sources but embraces none."

Track listing
All songs written by Bob Geldof unless otherwise indicated.

1979 Vinyl Release 
Side A

 "Someone's Looking at You" – 4:22
 "Diamond Smiles" – 3:49
 "Wind Chill Factor (Minus Zero)" – 4:35
 "Having My Picture Taken" (Geldof, Pete Briquette) – 3:18
 "Sleep (Fingers' Lullaby)" (Johnnie Fingers) – 5:30

* A hidden track (with lyrics including "that's not funny, I'm not laughing"), on the original LP playing through to the run-out groove. Side B

 "I Don't Like Mondays" (Geldof, Johnnie Fingers) – 4:16
 "Nothing Happened Today" – 3:18
 "Keep It Up" (Geldof, Gerry Cott) – 3:39
 "Nice N Neat" – 2:50
 "When the Night Comes" – 5:00

* A hidden track of a warped voice saying "That concludes episode 3. We will return..."

2005 re-release bonus tracks
 "Episode 3" (a combination of both hidden tracks on the vinyl release) –1:10 
"Real Different" (B-side of "Elephant's Graveyard") – 2:39
 "How Do You Do?" (B-side of "Like Clockwork") – 2:39
 "Late Last Night" (B-side of "Diamond Smiles") – 2:43
 "Nothing Happened Today" (Live in Cardiff) – 3:44

Personnel
Credits adapted from album liner notes and AllMusic.

The Boomtown Rats
 Bob Geldof – vocals, saxophone
 Pete Briquette – bass, vocals
 Gerry Cott – guitar
 Johnnie Fingers – keyboards, vocals
 Simon Crowe – drums, vocals
 Garry Roberts – guitar, vocals

Additional musicians
 Fiachra Trench – string arrangement on "I Don't Like Mondays"

Technical
 Arun Chakraverty – mastering
 Fin Costello – photography
 Robert John "Mutt" Lange – production
 Chuck Loyola – inner sleeve artwork and design
 Lorne Miller – cover artwork and design
 Tony Platt – engineering
 Phay Taylor – lighting
 Phil Wainman – production on "I Don't Like Mondays"

Charts

Certifications

References

1979 albums
The Boomtown Rats albums
Albums produced by Robert John "Mutt" Lange
Albums produced by Phil Wainman
Albums recorded at Trident Studios